Sir Kanthiah Vaithianathan CBE (1896–1965) (also spelt Vaidyanathan) was a Ceylonese civil servant, politician, Member of the Senate and Minister of Housing and Social Services.

Civil service career
Having graduated with a BSc from the University of London, he joined the Ceylon Civil Service. In 1947 he became the first Permanent Secretary to the Ministry of External Affairs and Defence of independent Ceylon.

Political career
In 1952 Vaithianathan was appointed by the Governor General to the Senate of Ceylon and appointed Minister of Housing and Social Services. In 1953, he was also given the Industries portfolio following the resignation of G. G. Ponnambalam, Minister of Industries and Fisheries.

Social service
He was the President of the Rotary Club of Colombo, patron of the Colombo Tamil Sangam and one of the founders of the Hindu Educational Society which established the Colombo Hindu College. He was member of the Royal Asiatic Society (Ceylon) Branch.

Honors
Vaithianathan, was appointed a Commander of the Order of the British Empire (CBE) in the 1949 New Year Honours and knighted as a Knight Bachelor in the 1950 Birthday Honours.

Family
He was married to Lady Vaithianathan. His son Mahen Vaithianathan was one of the first diplomats of the Ceylon Overseas Service. He lived at "Senthil", Charles Place, Colombo 3.

References

External links

1896 births
1965 deaths
Alumni of St. Patrick's College, Jaffna
Housing ministers of Sri Lanka
Industries ministers of Sri Lanka
Permanent secretaries of Sri Lanka
People from British Ceylon
Members of the Senate of Ceylon
Social affairs ministers of Sri Lanka
Sri Lankan Hindus
Ceylonese Knights Bachelor
Ceylonese Commanders of the Order of the British Empire
Sri Lankan Tamil civil servants
Sri Lankan Tamil politicians